Imadu Dooyum (born 24 November 1980) is a Nigerian football player currently playing for Akwa United F.C. In August 2004 he was on trial with KV Mechelen.

External links
 Details of last Nigeria cap at LG Cup
 KV Mechelen site
 Akwa captain set to dump Globacom Premier League 

1980 births
Living people
Bendel Insurance F.C. players
Rangers International F.C. players
Akwa United F.C. players
Lobi Stars F.C. players
BCC Lions F.C. players
Nigerian footballers
Nigeria international footballers
Association football midfielders